Psychroflexus halocasei  is a Gram-negative, strictly aerobic, halophilic, rod-shaped and non-motile bacteria from the genus of Psychroflexus which has been isolated from the surface of cheese in Salzburg in Austria.

References

Further reading

External links 
Type strain of Psychroflexus halocasei at BacDive -  the Bacterial Diversity Metadatabase

Flavobacteria
Bacteria described in 2012